The Audi R8 V12 TDI (later renamed the Audi R8 TDI Le Mans), was a diesel engined concept car that was first presented to the public at the 2008 North American International Auto Show on 13 January and then the Geneva Motor Show in March in the same year. The car was fitted with a 6.0-litre V12 engine, utilising Volkswagen Group's long-established Turbocharged Direct Injection (TDI) turbodiesel technology. The car utilises Audi's quattro permanent four-wheel drive system and a 6-speed manual transmission.

The R8 TDI Le Mans has modified suspension settings and brakes to cope with the additional power and weight, resulting from replacing the standard V8 engine with the V12 TDI. The V12 TDI requires more cooling than the standard R8, hence a NACA duct is incorporated in the roof to feed additional air into the engine. The vents on the front and back of the car have also been increased by 20% in size. The car all-LED headlamps which were first seen on the Audi Le Mans Quattro concept. For its appearance at the Detroit Motor Show, Audi fitted 20 inch alloy wheels.  The rear bulkhead has been moved forward in order to accommodate the physically larger V12 engine, meaning it loses the space behind the rear seats usually found on the standard R8.

In May 2009, Audi decided to halt plans for possible production of the R8 TDI, citing "the cost of re-engineering the petrol R8 to accommodate the massive twin-turbocharged diesel engine is simply too great – and that it would be unable to recoup its investment through sales alone".

References

External links

R8 Le Mans Concept
Coupés
Sports cars
Rear mid-engine, all-wheel-drive vehicles
Cars introduced in 2008